Dan Frost (born 22 May 1961 in Frederiksberg, Hovedstaden) is a retired male track cyclist from Denmark, who won the gold medal for his native country in the men's points race at the 1988 Summer Olympics in Seoul, South Korea. His other major victories include the world title in the same event in 1986 (Colorado Springs). He is the brother of cyclist Ken Frost. After retiring from racing he worked in management for Bjarne Riis's Team CSC for nine seasons before joining Team Sky as a directeur sportif for 2014 before leaving competitive cycling to organise bike trips and work with the Amaury Sport Organisation, the organisers of the Tour de France.

References

External links
 

1961 births
Living people
Sportspeople from Frederiksberg
Danish male cyclists
Danish track cyclists
Cyclists at the 1984 Summer Olympics
Cyclists at the 1988 Summer Olympics
Cyclists at the 1992 Summer Olympics
Olympic cyclists of Denmark
Olympic gold medalists for Denmark
Olympic medalists in cycling
Medalists at the 1988 Summer Olympics